Utair is a Russian airline with its head office at Khanty-Mansiysk Airport while its hubs are at Surgut International Airport and Vnukovo International Airport. It operates scheduled domestic and some international passenger services, scheduled helicopter services, and extensive charter flights with fixed-wing aircraft and helicopters in support of the oil and gas industry across western Siberia.

History 

In February 1967, the Aeroflot Tyumen Directorate was set up to meet the transport requirements of the fast-growing oil and gas industry undergoing development in western Siberia. In the wake of the break-up of the Aeroflot organization, Tyumenaviatrans Aviation (TAT) was formed in 1991 to replace the Aeroflot Tyumen Directorate. TAT adopted the name of UTair in 2002.
The airline is owned by Khanty Mansiysk District administration (23%), Surgut City administration (19%), Russian shareholders and companies (33%), the Russian Federation (2%), and private foreign investors (20%).

In October 2010, Utair announced plans to replace its Tupolev Tu-134 fleet with the Sukhoi Superjet 100. In December, UTair officially placed an order for 24 of the jets to enter service in 2013. Also in 2010, the airline named a Tu-154 aircraft after Boris Evdokimovich Sherbina, a Tyumenfigure.

In November 2014, Utair faced financial difficulties and was unable to make a bond payment. In April 2015, Utair announced a fleet reduction of over 50 aircraft due to financial difficulty. It also cancelled its order for 24 Sukhoi Superjet 100 aircraft. A few weeks later, its regional airline subsidiary UTair Express ceased operations.

In December 2015, it was announced that Utair sold its leisure subsidiary Azur Air to Turkish tourism company Anex Tourism Group, which had bought UTair-Ukraine a few weeks earlier. On 31 October 2017, Utair announced its rebranding and changing its name from "UTair Aviation" to "Utair".

On 8 April 2022 the US Department of Commerce restricted flights on aircraft manufactured in the US for Aeroflot, Aviastar, Azur Air, Belavia, Rossiya and Utair. It seems the US wants to reclaim ownership of the intellectual property. On 16 June the US broadened its restrictions on the six airlines after violations of the sanctions regime were detected. The effect of the restrictions is to ground the US-manufactured part of its fleet.

Destinations

Codeshare agreements
Utair has a codeshare agreement with following airlines:
Azerbaijan Airlines
FlyOne
NordStar Airlines
RusLine
Turkish Airlines

Fleet

Current fleet
, the Utair mainline fleet consists of the following aircraft (excluding helicopters and subsidiaries' aircraft):

Retired fleet

The airline used to operate these aircraft before.

Accidents and incidents 
On 17 March 2007, UTair Flight 471, a Tupolev Tu-134, crash-landed at Samara, killing 7 people and injuring 26.
On 2 July 2008, a Utair Mi-8 helicopter crashed in Yamal region, killing 9 and injuring 7 on board.
On 16 January 2010, a Utair Boeing 737-500, registration VQ-BAC, overrun the runway on landing at Vnukovo International Airport and was substantially damaged when the nosewheel collapsed.
On 20 December 2011, a Utair Mil Mi-26T helicopter crashed in an oilfield in Western Siberia; one person was killed. Utair grounded all its Mil Mi-26T helicopters following this incident.
The aircraft was carrying 39 passengers and 4 crew. To date, 10 survivors with serious injuries and burns have been confirmed.
On 4 July 2012, a helicopter operated by Utair for an oil and gas company crashed in a remote area about 4 kilometers from the runway of Lensk Airport near Lensk. The wreckage was found several hours later and three bodies were recovered, with the fourth person presumed killed. The cause was not immediately known, but Utair grounded all aircraft at Lensk Airport pending an investigation into the quality of fuel supply at the airport.
On 4 August 2018, an MI-8 helicopter belonging to Utair crashed about 180 km from the town of Igarka, in Krasnoyarsk Territory, killing all 18 on board.
On 1 September 2018, Utair Flight 579, a Boeing 737-800, registration VQ-BJI, on a flight from Vnukovo with 164 passengers and 6 crew, overran the runway and caught fire while landing in Sochi, injuring 18 people.
 On 9 February 2020, Utair Flight 595, a Boeing 737-500 on a domestic flight from Vnukovo International Airport (Moscow), crash-landed at Usinsk Airport, Russia following a landing gear collapse. All 100 passengers and crew survived the accident.

References

Literature

External links 

 

Airlines established in 1967
Airlines of Russia
Airlines banned in the European Union
Russian brands
Former Aeroflot divisions
Helicopter airlines
Companies listed on the Moscow Exchange
1967 establishments in Russia
Companies based in Khanty-Mansi Autonomous Okrug